Plagiobothrys figuratus is a species of flowering plant in the borage family known by the common name fragrant popcornflower. It is native to western North America from southern British Columbia to south-western Oregon, and it can also be found in areas east such as Michigan and Illinois.

One rare subspecies, ssp. corallicarpus, is endemic to Oregon.

References

figuratus